"Country Boy (You Got Your Feet in L.A.)" is a song written by Dennis Lambert and Brian Potter, and recorded by American country music singer Glen Campbell. It was released in October 1975 as the second and final single from the album, Rhinestone Cowboy.

It was Campbell's fifth number 1 on the Easy Listening chart and went to number 11 in early 1976 on the Billboard Hot 100.  "Country Boy (You Got Your Feet in L.A.)" also went to number 3 on the country chart.

Chart performance

Weekly charts

Year-end charts

References

Songs about Los Angeles
1975 singles
1976 singles
1975 songs
Glen Campbell songs
Songs written by Brian Potter (musician)
Capitol Records singles
Songs written by Dennis Lambert